The Pemigewasset River , known locally as "The Pemi", is a river in the state of New Hampshire, the United States. The name "Pemigewasset" comes from the Abenaki word bemijijoasek [bəmidzidzoasək], meaning "where side (entering) current is".

Geography
The Pemigewasset originates at Profile Lake in Franconia Notch State Park, in the town of Franconia. It flows south through the White Mountains and merges with the Winnipesaukee River to form the Merrimack River at Franklin.  The Merrimack then flows through southern New Hampshire, northeastern Massachusetts and into the Atlantic Ocean.

The Interstate 93 highway runs parallel with the river between Franconia Notch and New Hampton.  The river passes through the communities of Lincoln, North Woodstock, Woodstock, Thornton, Campton, Plymouth, Holderness, Ashland, Bridgewater, Bristol, New Hampton, Hill, Sanbornton, and Franklin.

The river descends over waterfalls in Franconia Notch, including "The Basin", passes cascades in North Woodstock, and drops over Livermore Falls north of Plymouth.  The remainder of the northern Pemi, from Lincoln to Ashland, passes over copious gravel bars and attracts numerous boaters and fishermen.  Below Ashland, the river is impounded by the Ayers Island Dam, a hydroelectric facility, for over five miles.  A short stretch of heavy whitewater is found below the dam, before the river reaches the impoundment zone for the Franklin Falls flood control reservoir.  The river crosses one additional hydroelectric dam below Franklin Falls before joining the Winnipesaukee River in the center of Franklin, becoming the Merrimack River.

The watershed comprises about 20 percent of the Merrimack's total watershed area.

Tributaries

Major tributaries include (from north to south): 
East Branch of the Pemigewasset River.  The East Branch is larger and longer than the main branch of the river.
Moosilauke Brook (Lost River)
Mad River
Beebe River
Baker River
Squam River (outlet of Squam Lake)
Newfound River (outlet of Newfound Lake)
Smith River

See also

List of New Hampshire rivers

References

External links

EPA report on watershed status
 

Tributaries of the Merrimack River
Rivers of New Hampshire
Rivers of Merrimack County, New Hampshire
Rivers of Grafton County, New Hampshire
Rivers of Belknap County, New Hampshire
New Hampshire placenames of Native American origin